Andrei Vladimirovich Pletnyov (born 15 March 1971) is a former Russian football player and referee.

He worked as an assistant referee in the Russian Second Division in 2006.

His son Dmitry Pletnyov is also a football player.

External links
 

1971 births
Footballers from Saint Petersburg
Living people
Soviet footballers
Russian footballers
Russian expatriate footballers
Expatriate footballers in Ukraine
Expatriate footballers in Belarus
Russian Premier League players
Ukrainian Premier League players
FC Dynamo Saint Petersburg players
FC Lada-Tolyatti players
FC Zorya Luhansk players
FC Zenit Saint Petersburg players
FC Ural Yekaterinburg players
FC Torpedo Minsk players
FC Petrotrest players
Russian football referees
Association football midfielders
FC Lokomotiv Saint Petersburg players